Operación Masacre is a 1973 historical drama film co-written and directed by Jorge Cedrón and based on the nonfiction book of the same name by Rodolfo Walsh, who also wrote the script. It was filmed clandestinely (in hiding) during the self-styled "Argentine Revolution" dictatorship (1966–1973), and finally released on September 27, 1973.

Synopsis 
In 1956, one year after the self-styled "Liberating Revolution" dictatorship deposed Argentine president Juan Perón in a coup, a civil-military insurrection failed in its attempt to take on the power in the name of peronism. In retaliation, in a vacant lot in the city of José León Suárez (province of Buenos Aires), several civilians accused of being part of the uprising are illegally shot by the dictatorship. However, seven people manage to survive and tell their story to the world.

Cast 
 Norma Aleandro - Berta Figueroa de Carranza
 Carlos Carella - Nicolás Carranza 
 José María Gutiérrez - Norberto Gabino 
 Víctor Laplace - Carlos Lizaso 
 Raúl Parini - Police commissioner Rodríguez Moreno 
 Ana María Picchio
 Walter Vidarte - Juan Carlos 
 Zulema Katz - Florinda 
 Julio Troxler - Himself
 Blanca Lagrotta - Pilar de Di Chiano
 Luis Barrón
 Miguel Narciso Bruse - Horacio Di Chiano
 Fernando "Tacholas" Iglesias - Guard
 Fernando Labat - Police commissioner Penas
 Carlos Antón
 Jorge de la Riestra - Lieutenant colonel Desiderio A. Fernández Suárez
 Enrique Alonso   
 Julio Di Palma - Gordo Rodríguez
 Pachi Armas - Police officer Shorthand 1 
 Hedy Crilla
 José Arriola   
 Luis Barrón   
 Leonardo Belin   
 Raúl Bobbio   
 Sara Bonet   
 Rodolfo Brindisi - Prisoner
 Oscar Calvo   
 Oscar Canoura   
 María Cignacco   
 Hubert Copello   
 Martín Coria - Police officer taking a statement
 Héctor Dangelo   
 Samuel Desse   
 David Di Napoli   
 Óscar Ferreiro - Juan Carlos Torres 
 Mario Fogo   
 Susana Langan   
 Modesto López   
 Luis Martínez Rusconi   
 Pedro Martínez   
 Manuel Mendel   
 Rodolfo Morandi   
 Edgardo Nervi   
 Norberto Pagani   
 Rodolfo Relman   
 Luis Rondini   
 Héctor Sajón   
 Enrique Scope   
 David Socco   
 Guillermo Sosa   
 Pepe Sterrantino   
 Hugo Álvarez - Francisco Garibotti
 Mario Pinasco

References

External links 
 
 Operación Masacre at Cinenacional.com

1973 films
1970s crime drama films
1970s thriller films
Argentine thriller films
1970s Spanish-language films
Films based on Argentine novels
Films based on crime novels
Films set in Argentina
Films set in Buenos Aires
Films shot in Buenos Aires
Cultural depictions of Eva Perón
Films set in the 1950s
Political drama films
1976 films
1973 drama films
Films about freedom of expression
Films about political repression
Films based on non-fiction books
1970s political films
1976 drama films